Casuarina Senior College (formerly known as Casuarina High School) is a coeducational state college situated in Casuarina, a northern suburb of Darwin, Northern Territory, Australia.

History

Casuarina High School opened in 1973 with a cohort of 200 students. In 1974 Cyclone Tracy devastated Darwin and in 1975 Casuarina High School virtually became the "Northern Suburbs Area School" and comprised a creche, preschool, primary and high school in one, while the surrounding schools were rebuilt. The school population at the time rose up to 1200. By 1976 the school was back to normal operations and a Music School was established on the site.

In 1977 an Agricultural Science program was established. The following year (1978) the first school based Interpreter and Translator course commenced, it is thought to have been the first in Australia. The Duke of Edinburgh Award scheme commenced as did an Amateur Radio Centre. Unfortunately the Radio Centre disbanded in 1979 and the school population rose to about 950.

The Radio Centre re-opened and another new high school (Dripstone High School) was established in the northern suburbs reducing student numbers at Casuarina High School. The school continued to operate as a comprehensive secondary school until 1985. A review of education led to system wide changes. For Casuarina High School, 1986 meant that the school was designated as a senior secondary college. This resulted in a name change to Casuarina Secondary College catering only for students in Years 11 and 12.

Casuarina Secondary College continued to operate as a senior secondary specialist school catering for students in the Darwin region. In 1994, the College changed its name to Casuarina Senior College. The College gained a reputation as a school that catered for independent learners in a more mature environment and achieved excellent results.

The College continued to operate as a senior secondary specialist until 2006 offering opportunities in vocational and academic programs. In 2006, a review of education in the NT led to the introduction of the stages of schooling. At this point Casuarina Senior College welcomed Year 10 students to the school.  Years 10 - 12 was established as the senior secondary phase of schooling.  A Centre for Excellence in Medicine and Health Sciences was established in 2011.

In addition, changes to policy meant that the minimum school leaving age has changed and this has also contributed to the nature, strategic directions and changes within the College.

References and notes

External links
 Official site

Public high schools in Darwin, Northern Territory
Educational institutions established in 1973
1973 establishments in Australia
Casuarina